Decipium was the proposed name for a new chemical element isolated by Marc Delafontaine from the mineral samarskite. He published his discovery in 1878 and later published a follow-up paper in 1881.

Decipium was considered to be in the cerium group of rare earths.

In 1880 spectral analysis proved that decipium had a high samarium content. It is now believed that Delafontaines decipium sample was a mixture of samarium with traces of other rare earth elements.

References

Misidentified chemical elements
Samarium
1878 in science